Daniil Tarasov may refer to:
 Daniil Tarasov (ice hockey, born 1991)
 Daniil Tarasov (ice hockey, born 1999)